The Upper Murray Football Netball League (UMFNL) is an Australian Rules Football and Netball competition based in the rural town of Corryong, Victoria, Australia. The league contains five clubs from around the townships & farming districts of the greater Upper Murray area, including the three founding clubs from 1893.

The league features three grades in the Australian rules football competition, with these being Senior-Grade, Under 14's, with Under 10's as Auskick. In the netball competition, there are six grades, with these being A-Grade, B-Grade, C-Grade, D-Grade, Under 15's, with Under 11's as Netta. Results from Auskick & Netta are normally not recorded and final series are normally not played, instead, emphasis is put on having fun while playing sport and improving their skills.

There are many pieces of league memorabilia scatted throughout the Upper Murray region, including some photos & trophies away from clubroom and sporting grounds. Some notable locations include Bridge Hotel (Jingellic), Corryong Hotel Motel, Corryong Sporting Complex, Courthouse Hotel (Corryong), Hotel Cudgewa, Khancoban Country Golf Club, Koetong Pub, Riley's Restaurant (Corryong), The Man from Snowy River Museum (Corryong), Tintaldra Hotel, & Walwa Hotel.

History

Establishment (1892–1893)
During the 1892/1893 summer three of the regions cricket clubs agreed to the establishment of a competition in order to keep their players fit during the winter break. The three founding clubs were Corryong, Cudgewa, and Mount Elliot, and in early 1893 the Corryong Football Association was officially established.

The league is one of the oldest Football Leagues in Victoria still active today. It was established 16 years after the first Victorian Football Association (VFA/VFL) season, the same year as the first Ovens & Murray Football Association season, 4 years before the first Victorian Football League (VFL/AFL) season, and 10 years before the first Ovens & King Football Association season. Additional the league was established almost 1 year before the Corryong Courier newspaper was first published on January 25, 1894.

Corryong Football Association (1893–1899)
During the first five years of the association only the three founding clubs competed in the competition, and the "championship" was awarded to the club that finished in 1st position on the ladder. The early "champions" included Corryong (1893, 1895, 1899) and Mount Eliot (1894, 1897, 1898). The only exception was in 1896 when Cudgewa defeated Mount Elliot in the first final played, unfortunately the details of this occasion are now lost.

At the start of the 1898 season, the competition expanded for the first time in its short history to include a fourth football club, Walwa, representing the township of Walwa, Victoria. The addition of the  Walwa FC  to the competition was seen as a success, and during their second season they finished in second position on the 1899 Ladder.

The same season, 1899, the competition expanded to include a fifth football club,  Khancoban FC  representing the township of Khancoban, New South Wales. However, the addition of the  Khancoban FC  to the competition was less successful. Only lasting two seasons, they finished in third and fourth respectively.

Upper Murray Football Club Association (1900–1901)
At the start of the 1900 season the competition renamed itself to the  Upper Murray Football Club Association , and after the 1900 season the  Khancoban FC  went into recess for the first time. In 1901, the  Mount Elliot FC  renamed itself to the  Federal FC .

Upper Murray Football Association (1902–1903)
At the start of the 1902 season the league name changed again, to the  Upper Murray Football Association .

Corryong District Association (1904–1906)
At the start of the 1904 season the league name changed again, to the  Corryong District Association , also the  Federal FC  relocated from Mount Elliot, Vic to Corryong, Vic.

The Khancoban FC relocated from Khancoban, NSW to Towong, Vic in 1904 and became the Towong FC before renaming to Towong Wanderers FC in 1905. Then in 1906 they relocated again to Thowgla, Vic and became the Thowgla FC, this move would result in the club's first premiership success, Thowgla 4.6 (30) defeating Corryong 2.8 (20).

Upper Murray Football Association (1907–1936)
In 1907 Cudgewa won the right to challenge the minor premiers, Corryong, in the grand final, but Corryong refused to play because an umpire for the grand final was not sourced from Albury, NSW.

By 1908, with a re-found form of success, Thowgla FC relocated back to Khancoban, NSW and renamed back to Khancoban FC and were runners-up in 1908, this was to be the last grand final match for the club. By 1910 the Corryong FC won its fourth straight premiership; 1907 (tied with Cudgewa FC), 1908, 1909, 1910.

From 1912 to 1913 Khancoban FC relocated to Tintaldra, Vic and became known as Tintaldra FC.

After the 1914 season the premiers of Tallangatta and Mitta Mitta Football Association, Federated Railways (a merged club formed by "Tallangatta FC" & "Tallangatta Valley FC"), traveled to Corryong Park to play the Combined Corryong team of both the Corryong & Federal football club's. As reported in the Corryong Courier on Thursday August 20, "The ground was in excellent order , and there was a large attendance of spectators." The Final scores were, Combined Corryong 9 goals & 12 behinds, Federated Railways 6 goals & 10 behinds. As far as records indicate, excluding Inter-League matches, this is the only time that players from the arch-rival football clubs of Corryong & Federal have played together as one club.

In 1916, with a lack of players in the region due to the First World War the Upper Murray Football Association went into recess.

In 1918 the association restarted but the 1918 and 1919 seasons were restricted to half seasons still due to a lack of players after the First World War.

By 1920 the competition was now representing only three townships, with four competing clubs Corryong, Cudgewa, Federal and Walwa.

Upper Murray Football League (1937-2000)

In 1950 the round 5 match between Corryong and Cudgewa saw a then-record gate takings of £30.

The UMFNL was also a part of the former recruiting zone known as VFL Country Recruiting Zone no.11, which from the 1960s to the 1980s was controlled by South Melbourne. However, no players were ever recruited from the Upper Murray under the zoning rules to play for South Melbourne.

The Upper Murray Football League won the North East Riverina Leagues Championships in 1976, & 1977 with Kevin Mack as Captain-Coach & John Cornish as Vice Captain. Also in 1977 John Cornish (from Tumbarumba FC) winning "Best player from all leagues in series", Kevin Mack (from Corryong FC) winning "Best player on ground against Hume League", & Craig Whitehead (from Corryong FC) winning "Best player on ground against Ovens & King".

Upper Murray Football Netball League (2001–present)
The 2001 season saw a lot of changes for the league including the resumption of the reserve-grade football competition after it folded in 1995, and the junior football competition changed from Under 18s to Under 16s. The introduction of a netball competition being run in conjunction with the football competition, sharing the same club names, colors and playing venues. The largest change seen the Bullioh Valley Football Club reforming in late 2000 as Bullioh Football Netball Club. In 2001 both the VCFL & UMFNL admitted the club into the competition for the 2001 season, despite protests of concerns that Bullioh would pinch players from both the Cudgewa FNC & the Tallangatta Valley FNC.

Unfortunately, since the 2002 season there have currently been no official Inter-League matches, the only exceptions are a handful of Junior Carnivals the last one attended was an AFL North East Border carnival in 2009, & the senior Netballer's since 2006 have regularly attended the Albury Indoor Carnival, normally held in October, after all the regions competitions have ended. The AFL North East Border other league's, the Ovens & Murray Football League, the Ovens & King Football League, & the Tallangatta & District Football League, along with AFL New South Wales/Australian Capital Territory league, the Hume Football League, have agreements with either The AFL Victorian Country Championships or other leagues across Victoria & New South Wales leaving the Upper Murray without the option for an opponent for most years.

In 2008 Federals had a poor season and finished last on the ladder, it was the first time since 1957 that the club didn't play finals.

Since 2013 the league has been affiliated with the AFL Victoria Country North East Border board who are responsible for overseeing the game across the greater local region. In 2019 the board has conducted feasibility studies into the future of the league with player numbers continuing to drop year over year.

In a first for the local area, the 2015 Round 13 (August 1, 2015) clash between Bullioh & Cudgewa at Tallangata Valley saw the match abandoned by the Umpire. During play in the third quarter Bullioh's Matt Tyrell was reported & requested to leave the ground by the Umpire. After five (5) minutes had past and Tyrell had refused to leave the field of play, a new rule allowed the Umpire officially abandon the match. As the incident has occurred after half time the scores were declared final and Cugdewa officially awarded the four premiership points, "Bullioh 2.1 (13) def. by Cudgewa 8.12 (60)." During that week's tribunal Bullioh's Matt Tyrell was cleared to play the following week after they took into account his excellent playing record, while teammate Taylor Fenton received a one-week suspension for abusive language from the same game.

As part of the AFL Victoria Country reforms to league operations a player point cap system will be introduced from the start of the 2016 season. Fellow leagues the Ovens and Murray, the Tallangatta and District, and the Ovens and King will also see the introduction of a player point cap system while the Hume league introduced the change to their league for the start of the 2015 season. For the UMFNL the player points cap has been set at 46 for 2016 before it drops by four in 2017.

At the Border-Walwa Football Netball Clubs annual general meeting on Sunday, 9 February 2020 the Border Mail reported that Border-Walwa Football Netball Club's had decided to enter recess for the 2020 season. A number of factors were cited including population decline, but mainly the devastation of the Upper Murray from the 2019/2020 Australian Bushfires. They hope to re-join the league in 2021. This was the first time a club had left the league since then end of the 1995 season when Tumbarumba entered a state of recess for one season.

Footy For Fires
The Footy For Fires is a charity event for the Upper Murray Bushfires.

Clubs

Current clubs

Active clubs

Recess clubs 

★ According to the AFL Victoria Country both Border-Walwa FNC & Federal FNC are still affiliated to the Upper Murray Football Netball League and have publicly stated their desires to rejoin the league in the future. However, they do not currently field any football or netball teams to compete in the competition but maintain some involvement with-in their local community including various fundraising events & community days.

Former clubs 

 Berringama FC

★ Berringama was established in 1929, and entered the competition that season. The club wore light coloured jumper with a dark coloured vee on the front, as the photo is in black and white the team's true colours are unknown. During their first season they were able to claim six points through a win along with a draw against Corryong. They withdrew from the competition after 7 rounds of the 1930 season on July 10, it's unclear as to why they withdrew but records show they were winless in 1930. They last competed in 1930, and since the 1931 season have not played, leading to the club being seen as folded.

 Tintaldra-Khancoban United FC

★ The football club has had a mixed past, having played under many names & colours as well as locations. The club itself was established in 1899 as Khancoban FC, they played from Khancoban (NSW) until 1900. After a three-year period of recess the club reappeared for the 1904 season as Towong Wanderers FC, they played from Towong (VIC) until 1905. They then relocated for the 1906 season to Thowgla (VIC) and were known as Thowgla FC until 1907. It was while the club was based in Thowgla that the club won their sole premiership when they defeated Corryong in the grand final, 4.6 (30) to 2.8 (20). For the 1908 season they relocated back to Khancoban (NSW) and were renamed back to Khancoban FC. After another three-year period of recess the club reappeared for the 1912 season as Tintaldra FC, they played from Tintaldra (VIC) until 1913. Then from 1914 the club was in recess for 38 years, before returning as Tintaldra FC for the 1951 season playing from Tintaldra (VIC). They would be known as Tintaldra FC until the 1961 season, and from the 1962 season the club would be known as Tintaldra-Khancoban United FC, playing from both Tintaldra (VIC) & Khancoban (NSW). They last competed in 1967, and since the 1968 season have not played, leading to the club being seen as folded.

 Tumut-Talbingo FC

★ Tumut was established in 1970, and first competed in the "Central Riverina Football League" until 1977. They then entered the Upper Murray Football League for the 1978 season, before going on to leave after the 1985 season. Tumut claimed their sole senior premiership in 1982 at the Cudgewa Football Ground when they defeated Cudgewa, 14.7 (91) to 8.10 (58). The club renamed to Tumut-Talbingo in 1986 before joining the "Farrar Football League - Division 2" for the 1986 season. They last competed in 1987, and since the 1988 season have not played, leading to the club being seen as folded.

Senior-grade honour boards

Notes
1907: Cudgewa won the right to challenge the minor premiers, Corryong, who refused to play because an umpire for the grand final was not sourced from Albury, NSW.
1918–1919: Only a half season was played due to a lack of footballers during and after World War I.
1945–1946: Only a half season was played due to a lack of footballers during and after World War II.

Ladder
KEY: [?] = Details are still unclear or are missing.

Grand Finals
KEY: [?] = Details are still unclear or are missing.

Season Structure 
Currently, the Upper Murray Football Netball League season runs from late April until early August, with matches traditionally played on Saturday's. There are fifteen home and away rounds where every club plays each other three times over the course of a season. There are three fixtures per round, with each fixture hosting three football games and six netball games across the day at the one venue. A total of 27 matches take place across the Upper Murray region each round.

There are no fixtured byes each round, but there are two league bye weekends. The first is normally in the second weekend of June to coincide with the Queen's Birthday Public Holiday across Victoria, the second is normally in the second weekend of July to coincide with the Winter School Holiday across Victoria.

While there is no official pre-season competition, the league's clubs are free to organise their own practice matches against any opponent either at home or away.

Current competitions
Since 2016 a number of the grades in the Australian rules football competition have discontinued, the last under 16's season was held in 2017 and the last reserves season was held in 2019. Additionally the under 13's competition became the under 14's, while in 2019 it was only competed by four clubs (Bullioh, Corryong, Cudgewa & Tumbarumba). There was also talk of scrapping the netball competition's d-grade in 2019, however the clubs voted in favour of retaining it for the 2020 season.

A green tick represents that competition will be held, while a red cross indicates that competition is not being held, the competitions for the 2020 Upper Murray Football Netball League are listed below.

 Football
  Seniors
  Reserves (Last Season: 2019)
  Under 16's (Last season: 2017)
  Under 14's
  Under 10's (Auskick)

 Netball
  A-Grade
  B-Grade
  C-Grade
  D-Grade
  Under 15's
  Under 11's (Netta)

Current finals system
The Upper Murray Football Netball League currently uses the "Page–McIntyre system". The final series is played over four Saturdays from early August until early September, with the grand final traditionally being played on the first weekend of September.

A home ground advantage is awarded to teams only according to the senior grade football, with all finals for both football & netball are played at the one venue during each final day. Unlike other leagues in the local area, the grand final is not played at a natural venue (like the TDFL/TDNA) or traditional venue (like the HAFNL), instead the winner of the major semi-final for the senior grade football is awarded hosting rights for that season's grand final.

In some cases a clubs team other than the senior grade football team may be listed as the "away team" as they might qualify second for that final. For example, in Cudgewa at the 2019 Grand Final the Cudgewa reserve grade football team was listed as the "away team" as they qualify second for the grand final.

General information

League honour boards

Club Results

Seasons

Interleague / community championships matches
t.b.a.

Individual awards

League medals

Life members

National League players

Netball honour boards

Premiers

Best & Fairest

Leading Goal Scorers

National League players 
T.B.A.

Inter-League matches 
T.B.A.

Notes

See also
Australian rules football in Victoria
Australian rules football in New South Wales
Zoning in Australian Rules Football
List of Australian rules football clubs by date of establishment
Tallangatta & District Football League
Farrer Football League
1992 AFL Draft
2010 AFL Draft

References

External links
 

1893 establishments in Australia
Sports leagues established in 1893
Australian rules football competitions in New South Wales
Australian rules football competitions in Victoria (Australia)
Netball leagues in New South Wales
Netball leagues in Victoria (Australia)